Highways & Dance Halls is the third studio album released by American country music artist Ty England. Released in 1999 as his only album for Capitol Nashville, it is also the only album which he recorded under his birth name of Tyler England.

Content
The tracks "My Baby No Está Aquí No More", "She Don't Care About Me", and "I'd Rather Have Nothing" were later recorded by Garth Brooks on his album The Lost Sessions, while "Travelin' Soldier" — originally cut in 1996 by its writer, Bruce Robison — would become a Number One country hit in 2003 when the Dixie Chicks released it. Also included is a re-recording of England's 1995 hit "Should've Asked Her Faster", re-recorded here with Steve Wariner as a guest musician.

Critical reception

Giving it 3 out of 5 stars, Maria Konicki Dinoia of Allmusic wrote that "What England does lack is vocal enthusiasm, but he makes up for it in originality. Produced by his college buddy Garth Brooks, Highways & Dancehalls is a verifiable reprieve from the bubble gum music we've gotten used to hearing on radio".

Track listing
"My Baby No Está Aquí No More" (Shane Stockton, David Stephenson) – 2:44
"She's Gonna Miss Me When He's Gone" (Stephenson) – 3:43
"She Don't Care About Me" (Bruce Robison) – 2:56
"I Drove Her to Dallas" (Mark Narmore, Tony Martin) – 3:33
"Blame It on Mexico" (Sherrie Gregg, Darrel Staedtler) – 2:58
"Forever" (Rafe Van Hoy) – 3:42
"Too Many Highways" (Clay Blaker, Stephenson) – 3:37
"Collect from Wichita" (Neal Coty, Randy VanWarmer) – 4:36
"I'd Rather Have Nothing" (Mike McClure) – 4:05
"I Knew I Loved You" (Byron Hill, Gary Scruggs) – 3:19
"Travelin' Soldier" (Robison) – 5:29
"Should've Asked Her Faster" (Bob DiPiero, Al Anderson, Joe Klimek) – 3:23
featuring Steve Wariner

Personnel
From Highways & Dance Halls liner notes.
Musicians
Sam Bacco - percussion
Bruce Bouton - steel guitar
Garth Brooks - acoustic guitar, background vocals
Sam Bush - mandolin
Mark Casstevens - acoustic guitar
Mike Chapman - bass guitar
Jerry Douglas - Dobro
Rob Hajacos - fiddle
Gordon Kennedy - electric guitar, background vocals
Wayne Kirkpatrick - background vocals
Chris Leuzinger - acoustic guitar, electric guitar
The Nashville String Machine (Carl Gorodetzky, Pamela Sixfin, Conni Ellisor, Alan Umstead, Mary Kathryn Van Osdale, Bob Mason, and Jim Gorsjean) - strings
Bruce Robison - steel guitar, background vocals
Milton Sledge - drums, percussion
Wayne Toups - accordion
Steve Wariner - electric guitar, background vocals
Bobby Wood - keyboards
Andrea Zonn - background vocals

Technical
Garth Brooks - production
Dennis Burnside - string arrangements, conducting
Eric Conn - digital editing
Carlos Grier - digital editing
Mark Miller - recording
Denny Purcell - mastering
Glenn Spinner - additional vocal recording

References

1999 albums
Capitol Records albums
Ty England albums